The Paterson Daily Press was a newspaper in Paterson, New Jersey published from 1863 to 1907.

External links
Paterson Daily Press at Library of Congress

Paterson, New Jersey
Defunct newspapers published in New Jersey
Publications established in 1863
Publications disestablished in 1907